Coalesce may refer to:

Coalesce (band), a metalcore band from Kansas City, Missouri, active from 1994 to 1999, 2005–
Coalesce discography, a list of Coalesce's albums and songs
COALESCE, an SQL function
Null coalescing operator, a binary operator that is part of the syntax for a basic conditional expression in several programming languages
Coalescing (computer science), the act of merging two adjacent free blocks of memory
 Coalesce / Boysetsfire, a split music album released in 2000
 Timer coalescing, an energy-saving technique for processors

See also 
 Coalescence (disambiguation)
 Coalescer
 Coalescent, a science-fiction novel
 Coalescent theory, a model of how alleles sampled from a population may have originated from a common ancestor
 Coalition